AFK Atlantic Lázně Bohdaneč was a Czech football club from the town of Lázně Bohdaneč, which played one season in the Czech First League. It was founded in 1918.

Bohdaneč won promotion to the country's top flight, the Czech First League, after finishing second in the 1996–97 Czech 2. Liga. The club subsequently featured in the 1997–98 Czech First League, finishing bottom of the league and winning only two of their thirty matches.

During a 1999 Czech 2. Liga away match against Prostějov, club owner Jiří Novák ordered his players to walk off the pitch, with 43 minutes played and the score 2–1 to the hosts, citing the poor performance of referee Michal Paták as the reason. According to a spokesman from the ČMFS, this was the first time a professional team had abandoned a game in the league. The club was subsequently fined 300,000 CZK by the football association and the match was awarded 3–0 to Prostějov. The club ceased to exist in 2000, following a merger with Slovan Pardubice.

Historical names
 1918 – AFK Lázně Bohdaneč
 1948 – Sokol Lázně Bohdaneč
 1994 – AFK Atlantic Lázně Bohdaneč
 2000 – merged with Slovan Pardubice

History in domestic competitions

 Seasons spent at Level 1 of the football league system: 1
 Seasons spent at Level 2 of the football league system: 3
 Seasons spent at Level 3 of the football league system: 1
 Seasons spent at Level 4 of the football league system: 1

Czech Republic

Notable former players

Honours
Czech 2. Liga (second tier)
 Runners-up 1996–97
Bohemian Football League (third tier)
 Champions 1995–96

References

Defunct football clubs in the Czech Republic
Association football clubs established in 1918
Association football clubs disestablished in 2000
Czech First League clubs
Pardubice District
1918 establishments in Czechoslovakia
2000 disestablishments in the Czech Republic